Coca-Cola Bottling Company Plant is a historic Coca-Cola bottling plant located at Bloomington, Monroe County, Indiana.  The original section was built in 1924, and is a two-story, roughly square, red brick building.  A one-story section was added in a renovation of 1938–1939, along with Art Deco style design elements on the original building.  It closed as a bottling plant in 1989, and subsequently converted for commercial uses.

It was listed on the National Register of Historic Places in 2000.

References

Coca-Cola buildings and structures
Industrial buildings and structures on the National Register of Historic Places in Indiana
Industrial buildings completed in 1924
Art Deco architecture in Indiana
Buildings and structures in Bloomington, Indiana
National Register of Historic Places in Monroe County, Indiana
Drink companies of the United States